The president of the Senate of Jordan is the presiding officer of the Senate of Jordan. The president is appointed by the king of Jordan by royal decree, and the term of the office is two years.

Below is a list of office-holders from 1947:

References

Politics of Jordan
Jordan, Senate